The Yangtze Delta or Yangtze River Delta (YRD,  or simply ) is a triangle-shaped megalopolis generally comprising the Wu Chinese-speaking areas of Shanghai, southern Jiangsu, northern Zhejiang and northern Jiangxi. The area lies in the heart of the Jiangnan region (literally, "south of the River"), where the Yangtze River drains into the East China Sea. Having fertile soil, the Yangtze Delta abundantly produces grain, cotton, hemp and tea. In 2018, the Yangtze Delta had a GDP of approximately US$2.2 trillion, about the same size as Italy.
 
The urban build-up in the area has given rise to what may be the largest concentration of adjacent metropolitan areas in the world. If based on the greater Yangtze Delta zone, it has over 140 million people in this region. With about a tenth of China's population and a fifth of the country's GDP, the YRD is one of the fastest growing and richest regions in East Asia measured by purchasing power parity.

History

Since the fourth century, when the national capital was moved to Jiankang (present-day Nanjing) at the start of the Eastern Jin dynasty (AD 317–420), the Yangtze Delta has been a major cultural, economic, and political centre of China. Hangzhou served as the Chinese capital during the Southern Song dynasty (1127–1279), and Nanjing was the early capital of the Ming dynasty (1368–1644) before the Yongle Emperor moved the capital to Beijing in 1421.

Other key cities of the region in pre-modern times include Suzhou and Shaoxing. The ancient Suzhou was the capital of the Wu state (12th century BC–473 BC), and the ancient Shaoxing was the capital of the Yue state (20th century BC?–222 BC). Nanjing first served as a capital in the Three Kingdoms period as the capital of Eastern Wu (AD 229–280). In these periods, there were several concomitant states or empires in China and each one had its own capital.

Since the ninth century, the Yangtze Delta has been the most populous area in China, East Asia, and one of the most densely populated areas of the world. During the mid to late period of the Tang dynasty (618-907), the region emerged as an economic centre, and the Yangtze Delta became the most important agricultural, handicraft industrial and economic centre for the late Tang dynasty.

In the Song dynasty, especially during the Southern Song dynasty (1127–1279), with its capital situated in Lin'an (present-day Hangzhou), Lin'an became the biggest city in East Asia with a population more than 1.5 million, and the economic status of the Yangtze Delta became more enhanced. Ningbo became one of the two biggest seaports in East Asia along with Quanzhou (in Fujian province).

During the mid-late Ming dynasty (1368–1644), the first bud of capitalism of East Asia was born and developed in this area, although it was disrupted by the Manchu invasion and controlled strictly and carefully by the Confucian central government in Beijing, it continued its development slowly throughout the rest of the Qing dynasty (1644-1911). During the Ming and Qing dynasties, the delta became a large economic centre for the country, and also played the most important role in agriculture and handicraft industry.

During the Qianlong era (1735-1796) of the Qing dynasty, Shanghai began developing rapidly and became the largest port in the Far East. From late 19th century to early 20th century, Shanghai was the biggest commercial centre in the Far East. The Yangtze Delta became the first industrialized area in China. In the middle and late feudal society of China, the Yangtze River Delta region initially formed a considerable urban agglomeration.

After the Chinese economic reform program, which began in 1978, Shanghai again became the most important economic centre in mainland China, and is emerging to become one of Asia's centres for commerce. In modern times, the Yangtze Delta metropolitan region is centred at Shanghai, and also flanked by the major metropolitan areas of Hangzhou, Suzhou, Ningbo, and Nanjing, home to nearly 105 million people (of which an estimated 80 million are urban residents). It is the centre of Chinese economic development, and surpasses other concentrations of metropolitan areas (including the Pearl Delta) in China in terms of economic growth, productivity and per capita income.

In 1982, the Chinese government set up the Shanghai Economic Area. Besides Shanghai, four cities in Jiangsu (Suzhou, Wuxi, Changzhou, Nantong) and five cities in Zhejiang (Hangzhou, Jiaxing, Shaoxing, Huzhou, Ningbo) were included. In 1992, a 14-city cooperative joint meeting was launched. Besides the previous 10 cities, the members included Nanjing, Zhenjiang and Yangzhou in Jiangsu, and Zhoushan in Zhejiang. In 1997, the regular joint meeting resulted in the establishment of the Yangtze Delta Economic Coordination Association, which included a new member Taizhou in Jiangsu in that year. In 1997, Taizhou in Zhejiang also joined the association. In 2003, the association accepted six new members after a six-year observation and review, including Yancheng and Huai'an in Jiangsu, Jinhua and Quzhou in Zhejiang, and Ma'anshan and Hefei in Anhui. In 2019, the area is expand to full Anhui, Jiangsu, Zhejiang, and Shanghai.

Demographics
Because of the large population of the delta, and factories, farms, and other cities upriver, the World Wide Fund for Nature says the Yangtze Delta is the biggest cause of marine pollution in the Pacific Ocean.

Most of the people in this region speak Wu Chinese (sometimes called Shanghainese, although Shanghainese is actually one of the dialects within the Wu group of Chinese) as their mother tongue, in addition to Mandarin. Wu is mutually unintelligible with other varieties of Chinese, including Mandarin.

Geography

Metropolitan areas

Cities

Central areas include Shanghai, Nanjing, Jiujiang, Wuxi, Changzhou, Suzhou, Nantong, Yangzhou, Zhenjiang, Yancheng, Taizhou (Jiangsu), Hangzhou, Ningbo, Wenzhou, Huzhou, Jiaxing, Shaoxing, Jinhua, Zhoushan, Taizhou (Zhejiang), Hefei, Wuhu, Maanshan, Tongling, Anqing, Chuzhou, Chizhou, Xuancheng.

Geology

Coastal erosion
The Three Gorge Dam has huge impacts on both upstream and downstream. Since 2003, the Yangtze River delta front has experienced severe erosion and significant sediment coarsening.

Subaqueous delta
The Yangtze River derived sediment has not really dispersed across the East China Sea continental shelf, instead, an elongated (~800 km) distal subaqueous mud wedge  (up to 60 m thick) extending from the Yangtze River mouth southward off the Zhejiang and Fujian coasts into the Taiwan Strait.

Culture
The Yangtze River Delta is not only a natural geographical area, but also a social, economic and cultural area, with the same or similar cultural traditions and historical memories. The Hui-style culture, Huaiyang culture, Wuyue culture, Shanghai style culture, Chu-Han culture, etc. have their own charms, but also infiltrate and merge with each other to form a colorful Yangtze River Delta culture. The profound humanistic heritage provides an endless stream of spiritual strength for the economic development of the Yangtze River Delta region, making it one of the most active areas of economic development, the highest degree of openness, and the strongest innovation capability in China.

Economy
The area of the Yangtze Delta incorporates more than twenty relatively developed cities in three provinces. The term can be generally used to refer to the entire region extending as far north as Lianyungang, Jiangsu and as far south as Wenzhou, Zhejiang. The region includes some of the fastest-growing economies in China in recent years, and as of 2004 has occupied over 21% of China's total gross GDP.

Fishing and agriculture
The Yangtze Delta contains the most fertile soils in all of China. Rice is the dominant crop of the delta, but further inland fishing rivals it. In Qing Pu, 50 ponds, containing five different species of fish, produce 29,000 tons of fish each year. One of the biggest fears of fish farmers in this region is that toxic water will seep into their man-made lagoons and threaten their livelihood.

Governance
Yangtze Delta regional cooperation require effort from governments of Shanghai, Zhejiang, Jiangsu, Anhui and Jiangxi.

They've gradually established a three-tier model of governance on increased regional cooperation:

Leadership: Symposium of Governors of YRD Area  (长三角地区主要领导座谈会)
Coordination: Joint Conference on Cooperation and Development of YRD Area (长三角地区合作与发展联席会议)
Operation: 
Offices of the Joint Conference (联席会议办公室)
Office of YRD Regional Cooperation (长三角区域合作办公室)
Specialized Task Forces (专题合作组)

There is also a conference with longer history for economical cooperation:
 Coordinative Conference on Economy for Cities in YRD (长三角城市经济协调会, since 1992)
 Joint Conference of Majors (市长联席会议)
 Office of the Coordination Society (协调会办公室)

Plans
Outline of the Regional Integration Development Plan of the Yangtze River Delta

Transportation

The area is home to an extensive transport network. The area has one of the highest private vehicle ownership rates in China, and traffic rules governing Jiangsu, Shanghai, and Zhejiang are relatively strict compared to the rest of the country.  The region contains major hubs for shipping and international trade, including the ports of Shanghai and Ningbo-Zhoushan, the world's largest container and cargo ports, respectively.  The region also includes the Hangzhou Bay Bridge, which at 36 km is the world's longest cross-sea bridge, and the densest network of rapid-transport rails in the world, spread out across 12 railway lines.

Climate

The Yangtze Delta has a marine monsoon subtropical climate, with hot and humid summers, cool and dry winters, and warm spring and fall. Winter temperatures can drop as low as -10 °C (a record), however, and even in springtime, large temperature fluctuations can occur.

References

External link

Economic profile for the Yangtze River Delta — at HKTDC—Hong Kong Trade Development Council.
Asian Times: "Growth cools in Yangtze River region"

 
Delta
River deltas of Asia
East China Sea
Geography of East China
Landforms of Jiangsu
Landforms of Shanghai
Landforms of Zhejiang
Metropolitan areas of China
Regions of China